Michael "Mickey" Bradley is the bassist for the Northern Irish pop punk band The Undertones. Bradley is also a radio producer for BBC Radio Foyle and presented a one-hour programme on Radio Ulster: "After Midnight with Mickey Bradley". The show featured tracks from the new wave/punk era. Bradley now presents a show titled "The Mickey Bradley Record Show" which airs from 7.30pm to 9.30pm every Friday night on BBC Radio Ulster with Bradley's discussing the records played with a Twitter audience.

In 2016, Bradley wrote a book titled Teenage Kicks: My Life as an Undertone.

Personal life
Bradley was born in Derry and is married to Elaine Duffy. They have four children.

In October 2006, Bradley revealed that he had received treatment for bowel cancer.

References

External links
The Mickey Bradley Record Show (BBC Radio Ulster)

Bass guitarists from Northern Ireland
Living people
Irish bass guitarists
New wave musicians from Northern Ireland
Musicians from Derry (city)
The Undertones members
Irish radio producers
People educated at St Joseph's Boys' School
Year of birth missing (living people)